Jensen Ridge is a curving ridge running eastward from Foca Point toward Jane Col on Signy Island in the South Orkney Islands. It was named in 1991 by the UK Antarctic Place-Names Committee after Captain Gullik Jensen, of the whaling ship Strombus from Tønsberg, Norway, who made the last whaling expedition to Signy Island in 1935–36.

References

Ridges of the South Orkney Islands